Hans Ludwig David Viktor Wolfgang ("Wolf") Graf Yorck von Wartenburg (9 September 1899 in  Schleibitz, Landkreis Oels – 12 September 1944 at Bonnal/Doubs, France) was a German politician for the Nazi Party (NSDAP).

He joined the Nazi Party on 1 July 1930  (Membership number 269 306), in which he first took over the duties of a district leader in Oels.

After the Nazis seized power in 1933, he was a group leader of the German Federation of East Silesia. He served as a district council member for Oels, and as a provincial member of parliament for Lower Silesia from November 1933 to March 1936, representing the constituency of Opole.

In the general election on 29 March 1936 he again ran for a seat but received no mandate.

Major Wolfgang Yorck von Wartenberg died in 1944 as a member of the German armed forces during major combat operations in France.

References

Nazi Party politicians
1899 births
1944 deaths
Members of the Reichstag of Nazi Germany
German Army personnel killed in World War II
German Army officers of World War II